Kōichi Saitō may refer to:

, Japanese photographer
, Japanese film director
, Japanese cinematographer